Angurud may refer to:
 Angurud, West Azerbaijan